The Huequén River is a river in the Malleco Province of Araucanía Region, Chile. The Huequén River is a tributary of the Vergara River. The city of Angol sits at the confluence of the river with the Malleco river. Rio Requén and Rio Ñipaco are tributaries of the Huequén River. The river undergoes seasonal flooding in the winter. 

References

Rivers of Chile
Araucanía Region
Geography of Araucanía Region